Nguyen Dinh Duc is a scientist in mechanical science and composite materials of Vietnam.

Biography

 Born in 1963 in Ha Noi, Vietnam.
 In 1984, he had graduated Hanoi State University, Vietnam.
 In 1991, he got Ph.D degree in Mathematics-Physics at the Moscow State University, Russia.
 In 1997, he got Doctor of Science (Dr. Habilitation) degree in Engineering at the Russian Academy of Sciences.
 In 2007, he had been appointed to Associate Professor at Vietnam National University, Hanoi.
 In 2013, he had been appointed to Full Professor at Vietnam National University, Hanoi.

Now, Duc Nguyen Dinh is Vice-President of Vietnamese Association of Mechanics, The Dean of Faculty of Civil Engineering, the Head of Laboratory of Advanced Materials and Structures - University of Engineering and Technology (UET) VNU Hanoi, the Director of Infrastructure Engineering Program of Vietnam-Japan University (VJU).  Nguyen Dinh Duc also is the Director of Undergraduate and Postgraduate Academic Affairs Department, Vietnam National University, Hanoi.

Nguyen Dinh Duc is the Head of Editorial Board of Mathematics and Physics Journal (in English) of Vietnam National University, Hanoi; Vietnam Journal of Mechanics (Vietnam Academy of Science and technology). He also is member of Editor Board (The Head of Engineering and Technology Session) of Vietnam Technology and Sciences Journal (Vietnam Ministry of Technology and Science) and the member of Editorial Board of 10 International ISI journals: Journal Cogent Engineering (UK, Taylor & Francis), Journal of Science: Advanced Materials and Devices (Elsevier), Journal of Science and Engineering of Composite Materials (De Gruyter), Part C: Journal of Mechanical Engineering Science (SAGE, UK), Journal Science Progress (SAGE), Alexandria Engineering Journal (Elsevier), Journal of Mechanical Science and Technology (Springer), Journal of Mechanics of Composite Materials (Springer), Journal of Applied Mathematics and Mechanics -Zeitschrift für Angewandte Mathematik und Mechanik, ZAMM (WILEY), Journal "Machine Science" (Azerbaijan Technical University).

Nguyen Dinh Duc is the member of the Professor Election Council in Mechanics of Vietnam. He has been the academician of Russian Academy of Natural Sciences and the member of International Academy of Scientific Inventions and Patents since 1999. He was the member of the Central Committee of the Vietnam Fatherland Front (1999-2004), the former vice-president and secretary general of Vietnam Science-Technical Association in Russia (1999-2001) and former Vice-President of Vietnamese Young Scientist Association in Vietnam (2004-2010). Professor Nguyen Dinh Duc have been awarded Silver Medal of Russian Academy of Natural Sciences for the Invention on The law-behavior of mechanical characteristic for three-phase composite 3Dm reinforced by spherical particles (in Russia, 1999) and the Third Prize of “Talented Vietnamese National Award ” (in Vietnam, 2008). With outstanding contributions and achievements in the science, in the education and training of the young talents for the country, he was twice awarded the Labor Medal by the President of Vietnam: 3-rd class Labor Medal (2016) and 2-nd Labor Medal (2022). 

Being not only a scientist but also a lecturer, Nguyen Dinh Duc has been responsible for a range of positions and contribute  to the education and training career of Vietnam National University, Hanoi (VNU).

Work history
 October 2012– Present: Full Professor, Vice -President of Vietnamese Association of Mechanics, Director of Academic Affairs (Undergraduate and Postgraduate) Department of Vietnam National University - Hanoi. Professor Nguyen Dinh Duc also is the Head of Advanced Materials and Structures Laboratory, the Dean of Faculty Civil Engineering - University of Engineering and Technology (VNU, Hanoi), the Program Director of Infrastructure Engineering, Vietnam Japan University (VJU). 
 November 2008 – September 2012: Vice President of University of Engineering and Technology - Vietnam National University, Hanoi.
 February 2005 – November 2008: Director of Science and Technology Department, Vietnam National University, Hanoi (VNU).
 October 2004 – February 2005: Vice Director of Science and Technology Department, Vietnam National University, Hanoi (VNU).
 March 2004 – September 2004: Vice-Director of Academic Affairs Department, Vietnam National University, Hanoi (VNU).

Nguyen Dinh Duc has participated in collaborative researches with reputable scientists from other countries such as the United States, Canada, Australia, France, Korea, Japan and so on. He has been the group leader of experts responsible for building up the PhD program in Engineering Mechanics at University of Engineering and Technology, VNU, Hanoi.

Publications and research areas of interest

Nguyen Dinh Duc has published over 300 international and national articles as well as scientific works, including over 200 research papers in ISI listed international journals. He has written 04 textbooks and monographs using for the undergraduate and graduate programs, in particular, one monograph about 3D, 4D composites had been published in Russian (Russian Publisher - USSR, 2002) and two other - about static and dynamic stability of FGMs structures and nonlinear vibration of auxetic plates and shells - have been published in English (VNU, Hanoi Publisher, 2014, 2021):
 1. Nguyen Dinh Duc, The sphero-fibers composite with space structure, URSS Publishing House, Moscow, Russia, 2000, 242 pages (Monograph, in Russian).
 2. Nguyen Hoa Thinh, Nguyen Dinh Duc, Composite materials - Mechanics and Technology of manufacture, Science and Technics Publishing House, Hanoi, Vietnam, 2002, 364 pages (Monograph).
 3. Nguyen Dinh Duc, Dao Nhu Mai, Strength of the Materials and Structures. Vietnam National University Press, Hanoi, 2012, 292 pages (Text book).
 4. Nguyen Dinh Duc, Nonlinear Static and Dynamic Stability of Functionally Graded Plates and Shells. Vietnam National University Press, Hanoi, 2014, 724 pages (Monograph, in English).
 5. Nguyen Dinh Duc, Tran Quoc Quan, Pham Hong Cong. Nonlinear Vibration of Auxetic Plates and Shells. Vietnam National University Press, Hanoi, 2021, 376 pages (Monograph, in English).

Nguyen Dinh Duc is a scientist in Vietnam who is pioneering in the study of carbon-carbon composite materials with space structure 3Dm, 4Dm and functionally graded composite materials (FGM), which are a new material generation, highly durable and heat resistant, used extensively in aerospace structures, missiles, details of the nuclear power plant, machine-building industry, etc. He has built up an academic school of thought using analytical methods to solve many problems related to the determination of mechanical-physical properties of materials, the static and dynamic stability of composite plates and shells, and other most recently as piezoelectric composite, functionally graded carbon nanotube-reinforced composite (FG CNTRC), auxetic materials, etc.

Analytical nonlinear formulation allowing the determination of the elastic modulus for nanocomposite materials reinforced by nanoparticles has been known to scientific communities by international publications associated with the name of Professor Nguyen Dinh Duc and a Russian scientist - Professor Vanin. 

In recent years, green energy and renewable energy are a main concern of the world and Vietnam. He has  approached this direction and coordinated with the Physics group at the VNU, Hanoi - University of Engineering and Technology to add nanoparticles properly to improve the mechanical-physical properties of nanocomposite polymers, such as in fabricating OLED organic photovoltaic materials, or in improving the energy conversion performance of solar panels, and in incorporating interdisciplinary physics-mechanics to study the stability of this three phase composite structure (including polymer matrix, reinforcement fiber and nanoparticles) under different loads. The research outcomes of Professor Nguyen Dinh Duc and his colleagues in the field of static and dynamic stability of FGM plates and shells, nanocomposite, composite structures with cracks, green and renewable energy have not only been published in international ISI journals, but Nguyen Dinh Duc have also been honored as “invited speaker” at many international conferences.

Nguyen Dinh Duc has built up the research group, established the new Laboratory of The Advanced Materials and Structures in Vietnam National University, Hanoi. He also established a new school of the Department of Technology in Civil Engineering and Transportation and become the first Dean of this Department, attracted young scientists from many domestic and foreign universities to join his research group, published many excellent “100% made in Vietnam” research papers in prestigious international ISI journals; trained many gifted students and talented PhD degree holders in the field of Mechanics, Engineering Mechanics and Civil Engineering for Vietnam. Nguyen Dinh Duc also is the Founder of training programs for Engineers of Technology in Civil and Transportation Engineering (in University of Engineering and Technology) and for Masters in Infrastructure Engineering (in Vietnam Japan University). He has been a reviewer for 70 international prestigious scientific journals such as Composite Structures, International journal of Mechanical Sciences, Journal of Sound and Vibration, Journal of Computational Materials Sciences, Journal of Composite Materials, Journal of Vibration and Control, Journal of Composite Part B: Engineering and so on. Nguyen Dinh Duc has participated in the organizing committee and scientific committee as well as being an invited speaker of many large national or international scientific conferences. Nguyen Dinh Duc's academic school and his research group about advanced composite materials and structures have a high reputation and are widely known in the domestic and foreign scientific communities.

The launching of new majors, the establishment of Laboratory of Advanced Materials and Structures and Faculty of Technology in Civil Engineering and Transportation in University of Engineering and Technology, Department of Infrastructure Engineering in Vietnam Japan University of Nguyen Dinh Duc have the contribution to the development and growth of the University of Engineering and Technology, Vietnam - Japan University and Vietnam National University, Hanoi. It is also the contribution of Nguyen Dinh Duc to the sustainable development of Vietnam's mechanics, the development of Civil Engineering and Infrastructure Engineering majors in Vietnam and training the country's well qualified human resources in these areas.

Nguyen Dinh Duc has received the VNU President's merit of excellence awards in years 2006,2009,2011,2013,2014, 2015, 2016,2017,2019,2020, 2021 and the Prime Minister's merit of excellence award in 2009. He was twice awarded the Labor Medal by the President of Vietnam: 3-rd class Labor Medal (2016) and 2-nd Labor Medal (2022). He also has been awarded "For Younger Generation" memorial medal by The Ho Chi Minh Communist Youth Union Central Committee (2017). 

In 2019, 2020, 2021, the Journal of PLoS Biology (US) announced ND Duc in list of 100,000 leading scientists in the world with the greatest impact. First ranking of Vietnamese scientists in this list is Prof. Nguyen Dinh Duc (VNU, Hanoi). In 2021, he has also been ranked 96th in the world in the field of Engineering         ..
His main research of interests:

 Composite with space structure (Carbon-carbon composite 3D, 4D)
 Dynamic and Vibration of Advanced Structures and Mechanics of composite materials
 Nonlinear stability of FGM plates and shells
 Composite structures with dynamic crack propagation
 Constructions and composite structures subjected to special loads
 Piezoelectric composite and auxetic materials
 Three phase composite and nanocomposite polymer
 Advanced materials and structures in Infrastructure Engineering and in Civil Engineering
 Nanocomposite and advanced materials in new energy and in renewable energy
 Mechanical problems related to climate change
 Applied Mathematics and Applied Mechanics

His main lectures using for undergraduate and graduate programs in VNU, Hanoi:

 Continuum Mechanics
 Theoretical Mechanics
 Mechanics of Deformed Solid
 Mechanics of Composite Materials and Composite Structures
 Strength of Material and Structures
 Static and dynamic stability of composite plates and shells
 Theory of Elastic and Plastic
 Theory of Plates and Shells
 New materials and advanced technology in Civil Engineering

References

External links
 Website of Research Group - Professor Dr Sci Nguyen Dinh Duc
 International Research Group in Advanced Materials and Engineering Mechanics.
 Prof Nguyen Dinh Duc is member of Editorial Advisory Board of Journal Cogent Engineering (Taylor & Francis, Scopus Journal)
 GS.TSKH Nguyễn Đình Đức - Người Thầy cả đời đam mê với sự nghiệp giáo dục.
 GS.TSKH Nguyễn Đình Đức - Nhân tài giúp nguyên khí quốc gia mạnh lên, Website: giaoducvietnam.vn.
 GS.TSKH Nguyễn Đình Đức - Triết lý của mô hình đào tạo tiên tiến, Website: giaoducvietnam.vn.
 Nguyễn Đình Đức - Người Thầy của Thời đại mới, Website: dantri.com.vn.
 Nguyễn Đình Đức: ĐHQGHN - Vườn ươm các nhà khoa học trẻ, VOV News: VOV.vn.
 GS Nguyễn Đình Đức: ĐHQGHN- Nơi thắp sáng tài năng, VNU News:vnu.edu.vn.
 GS Nguyễn Đình Đức: Phát triển nhóm nghiên cứu trong các trường đại học - Xu thế tất yếu, VOV News: VOV.vn.
 GS.TSKH Nguyễn Đình Đức: ĐHQGHN đổi mới tuyển sinh theo đánh giá năng lực Website: vnexpress.net.
 GS.TSKH Nguyễn Đình Đức: Phát hiện, đào tạo, bồi dưỡng nhân tài qua mô hình dào tạo hoc sinh chuyên o ĐHQGHN VNU News: vnu.edu.vn.
 GS.TSKH Nguyễn Đình Đức : Các chương trình đào tạo thí điểm - "đặc sản" trong đào tạo của ĐHQGHN VNU News: vnu.edu.vn
 GS.TSKH Nguyễn Đình Đức:Tự chủ đại học - Đua giáo sư để chạy theo hư danh Website: dantri.com.vn.
 GS. TSKH Nguyễn Đình Đức: Lần đầu tiên Việt Nam đào tạo thạc sỹ Kỹ thuật Hạ tầng theo chuẩn Nhật Bản Website: dantri.com.vn.
 Học trò của thầy Nguyễn Đình Đức: Phạm Toàn Thắng - sinh viên có 3 bài báo trên các tạp chí quốc tế ISI. Theo vov.vn.  
 Học trò của thầy Nguyễn Đình Đức: Trần Quốc Quân - Chàng trai 9X có 15 công bố khoa học quốc tế, Website: Vietnamnet.vn.
 Học trò của thầy Nguyễn Đình Đức: Phạm Hồng Công - Chàng trai 25 tuổi made in Vietnam có 17 bài báo quốc tế, Website: Thanhnien.vn.
 GS.TSKH Nguyễn Đình Đức: Người Thầy của những học trò xuất sắc "Made in Vietnam", Website: Dantri.vn.
 Professor Nguyen Dinh Duc: the fourth industrial revolution and Vietnam - Cuộc cách mạng công nghiệp lần thứ 4: Cơ hội và Thách thức với Việt Nam
 Professor Nguyen Dinh Duc: Đổi mới giáo dục đại học - Chiến lược để Việt Nam nắm bắt cơ hội mới trong cuộc cách mạng công nghiệp 4.0
 GS Nguyễn Đình Đức sáng lập ngành Công nghệ Kỹ thuật Xây dựng-Giao thông tại trường Đại học Công nghệ, ĐHQGHN
 GS Nguyen Dinh Duc: Mùa Xuân - Tuổi trẻ - Tương lai (Xuân Đinh Dậu 2017)
  PTN của GS Nguyễn Đình Đức - Vươn tầm quốc tế
 Người thầy, nhà khoa học xuất sắc trong cộng đồng khoa học quốc tế 
 About the patent of nanocomposite - Prof. Nguyen Dinh Duc in Vietnam TV

Living people
Moscow State University alumni
Academic staff of Vietnam National University, Hanoi
Year of birth missing (living people)